Ctenophorus reticulatus, the western netted dragon or western netted ground-dragon, is a species of lizard in the family Agamidae. It is found in South Australia, Western Australia and southern Northern Territory.

The species is a member of a diverse genus, Ctenophorus, that contains a group known as crevice and rock dragons. Snout-to-vent length is 108 mm. It has a blunt snout, short limbs, and round head. The adult males are red with black reticula; the females are paler with elongated dark blotches, while the juveniles are olive-grey.

Similar species
Ctenophorus nuchalis, central netted dragon

References

 

reticulatus
Reptiles of Western Australia
Reptiles described in 1845
Taxa named by John Edward Gray
Agamid lizards of Australia